Puerto Rico competed at the 2020 Summer Olympics in Tokyo. Originally scheduled to take place from 24 July to 9 August 2020, the Games were postponed to 23 July to 8 August 2021, because of the COVID-19 pandemic. It was the territory's nineteenth consecutive appearance at the Summer Olympics. Like on the 2016 Summer Olympics, Puerto Rico left the Olympics with a single gold medal, this time won by Jasmine Camacho-Quinn. Other athletes fell short of their Olympic medal, with Steven Piñeiro finishing sixth in the men's skateboarding street park final, and table tennis player Adriana Díaz losing a match in the third round.

Medalists

The following Puerto Rican competitors won medals at the games. In the by discipline sections below, medalists' names are bolded.

Competitors

Athletics

Puerto Rican athletes further achieved the entry standards, either by qualifying time or by world ranking, in the following track and field events (up to a maximum of 3 athletes in each event):

Track & road events

Basketball

Summary

Women's tournament 

Puerto Rico women's basketball team qualified for the first time at the Olympics as one of three highest-ranked eligible squads at the Bourges meet of the 2020 FIBA Women's Olympic Qualifying Tournament.

Team roster

Group play

Boxing

Puerto Rico entered one boxer into the Olympic tournament. With the cancellation of the 2021 Pan American Qualification Tournament in Buenos Aires, Argentina, Yankiel Rivera finished among the top five of the men's flyweight category to book his place in the Puerto Rican squad based on the IOC's Boxing Task Force Rankings for the Americas.

Diving

Puerto Rico received an invitation from FINA to send a diver competing in the men's platform to the Olympics based on his results at the 2021 FINA World Cup series.

Equestrian

Puerto Rico entered one eventing rider into the Olympic equestrian competition, by finishing in the top two, outside the group selection, of the individual FEI Olympic Rankings for Group E (Central and South America).

Eventing

Golf

Puerto Rico entered two golfers (one per gender) into the Olympic tournament. Rafael Campos (world no. 281) and Maria Fernanda Torres (world no. 185) qualified directly among the top 60 eligible players for their respective events based on the IGF World Rankings.

Judo
 
Puerto Rico qualified three judoka (one man and two women) for each of the following weight classes at the Games. Two-time Olympian Melissa Mojica (women's heavyweight, +78 kg) and Rio 2016 Olympian María Pérez (women's middleweight, 70 kg) were selected among the top 18 judoka of their respective weight classes based on the IJF World Ranking List of June 28, 2021, while rookie Adrián Gandía (men's half-middleweight, 81 kg) accepted a continental berth from the Americas as the nation's top-ranked judoka outside of direct qualifying position.

Rowing

Puerto Rico qualified one boat in the women's single sculls for the Games by finishing fifth in the A-final and securing the last of five berths available at the 2021 FISA Americas Olympic Qualification Regatta in Rio de Janeiro, Brazil, signifying the country's return to the sport for the first time since 1988.

Qualification Legend: FA=Final A (medal); FB=Final B (non-medal); FC=Final C (non-medal); FD=Final D (non-medal); FE=Final E (non-medal); FF=Final F (non-medal); SA/B=Semifinals A/B; SC/D=Semifinals C/D; SE/F=Semifinals E/F; QF=Quarterfinals; R=Repechage

Sailing

Puerto Rican sailors qualified one boat in each of the following classes through the class-associated World Championships, Pan American Games, and the continental regattas, marking the country's recurrence to the sport for the first time after sixteen years.

M = Medal race; EL = Eliminated – did not advance into the medal race

Shooting

Puerto Rico granted an invitation from ISSF to send Rio 2016 Olympian Yarimar Mercado in the women's rifle shooting to the Olympics, as long as the minimum qualifying score (MQS) was fulfilled by June 6, 2021.

Skateboarding

Puerto Rico entered two skateboarders to compete across all events at the Games. Steven Piñero and Manny Santiago were automatically selected among the top 16 eligible skateboarders in the men's park and men's street, respectively, based on the World Skate Olympic Rankings of June 30, 2021.

Swimming

Puerto Rico received a universality invitation from FINA to send two top-ranked swimmers (one per gender) in their respective individual events to the Olympics, based on the FINA Points System of June 28, 2021.

Table tennis
 
Puerto Rico entered three athletes into the table tennis competition at the Games. Rio 2016 Olympian Adriana Díaz secured an outright berth in the women's singles with a gold-medal victory at the 2019 Pan American Games in Lima, Peru. Adriana's older sister Melanie Díaz, with Brian Afanador joining them to compete on the men's side at his second consecutive Games, scored the initial-stage final match triumphs to book one of the available places each in their respective singles events at the Latin American Qualification Tournament in Rosario, Argentina.

Taekwondo

Puerto Rico entered one athlete into the taekwondo competition at the Games. American-born taekwondo practitioner Victoria Stambaugh secured a spot in the women's flyweight category (49 kg) with a top two finish at the 2020 Pan American Qualification Tournament in San José, Costa Rica.

Wrestling

Puerto Rico qualified one wrestler for the men's freestyle 74 kg into the Olympic competition, by progressing to the top two finals at the 2020 Pan American Qualification Tournament in Ottawa, Canada.

Freestyle

References

External links

Nations at the 2020 Summer Olympics
2020
2020 in Puerto Rican sports